Manfred Armando Antonio Reyes Villa Bacigalupi (born April 19, 1954) is a Bolivian politician, businessman, and former military officer. He was elected mayor of the city of Cochabamba five consecutive times, and became the elected Prefect of the Department of Cochabamba from 2006 until 2008 when he was recalled in that year's no confidence referendum.

He was an unsuccessful candidate for president in both 2002 and 2009, being the second runner in the latter. In 2009, he fled to the United States via Peru to avoid political persecution from the government of Morales, living in Miami for nearly 10 years.

Reyes Villa successfully ran for mayor of Cochabamba once again in the 2021 Bolivian regional elections, winning with 55% of the vote.

References

1954 births
Living people
20th-century Bolivian politicians
21st-century Bolivian politicians
Bolivian businesspeople
Bolivian expatriates in the United States
Bolivian military personnel
Candidates in the 2002 Bolivian presidential election
Candidates in the 2009 Bolivian presidential election
Governors of departments of Bolivia
Mayors of places in Bolivia
Nationalist Democratic Action politicians
New Republican Force politicians
People from La Paz
Plan Progress for Bolivia – National Convergence politicians
Solidarity Civic Unity politicians